Percy W. McGhee (c. 1890 - February 2, 1971) was an American architect who designed buildings in New Mexico (like the Doña Ana County Courthouse and the Thomas Branigan Memorial Library in Las Cruces) and Texas (like the El Paso County Coliseum and the United States Court House in El Paso). He was a member of the American Institute of Architects.

References

1971 deaths
People from El Paso, Texas
Architects from Texas
20th-century American architects
Year of birth uncertain